Seohaeicola zhoushanensis is a Gram-negative, facultatively anaerobic and motile bacterium from the genus of Seohaeicola which has been isolated from seawater from the Zhoushan Islands.

References

External links
Type strain of Seohaeicola zhoushanensis at BacDive -  the Bacterial Diversity Metadatabase

Rhodobacteraceae
Bacteria described in 2016